Premnagar is one of the 90 Legislative Assembly constituencies of Chhattisgarh state in India. It is in Surajpur district.

Members of Legislative Assembly

Election results

2018

See also
List of constituencies of the Chhattisgarh Legislative Assembly
Surajpur district

References

Surajpur district
Assembly constituencies of Chhattisgarh